The Heineken Classic was a men's professional golf tournament played in Australia from 1990 to 2005 as part of the PGA Tour of Australasia. From 1990 to 1992 it was called the Vines Classic.

It was held at the Vines Resort in Western Australia from 1990 to 2001 and moved to the Royal Melbourne Golf Club from 2002 to 2005. From 1996 onwards it was co-sanctioned by the European Tour. In 2005 it was the most lucrative golf tournament in Australasia, but the 2006 event was cancelled after the sponsor withdrew and the promoters were unable to find a replacement. This was one of a series of tournaments to be cancelled in Australia within the space of a few years. The winners of the Heineken Classic included former World Number 1s Ernie Els and Ian Woosnam and future U.S. Open champion Michael Campbell.

Winners

Notes

References

External links
Coverage on the European Tour's official site

Former PGA Tour of Australasia events
Former European Tour events
Golf tournaments in Australia
Recurring sporting events established in 1990
Recurring sporting events disestablished in 2005
1990 establishments in Australia
2005 disestablishments in Australia